In 2012, Blackpool Council ordered 16 Bombardier Flexity 2 trams for the Blackpool Tramway, becoming the worldwide launch customer for Bombardier Transportation's new design. The modern 100% low-floor trams replaced the Blackpool Tramway's tourist-focused and high maintenance heritage fleet, some of which have been retained with modifications for use as a supplementary fleet alongside the Flexity 2 trams and some for tourist services on the promenade. Blackpool's Flexity 2 trams are intended to be suitable for daily commuters and to provide a service competitive with other modes of transport and comply with legislation on accessibility for disabled users.

Two further Flexity 2 units arrived on 1 and 15 December 2017, entering service on 4 March 2018.

Background
Blackpool Council placed the £33m order for the 16 Flexity 2 trams in July 2009, with funding from the council, Department for Transport and Lancashire County Council. The worldwide launch of the Flexity 2 family took place with the unveiling of the first Blackpool tram on 8 September 2011. They entered service on 4 April 2012.

Details
The Blackpool Flexity 2 trams are bi-directional five-section articulated tramcars. There are four doors on each side, two single doors next to the driver cabs in the first and fifth cars and two double doors in the centre of the second and fourth cars. They can accommodate wheelchairs and pushchairs, with level boarding from low platforms which were built at stops ready for the introduction of the trams.

The trams have two powered Flexx Urban 3000 bogies in the centre of the first and fifth sections and an unpowered set in the centre car.

Livery
The final livery unveiled at the launch consists of white sides with black window surrounds and purple cabs, with a purple criss-cross pattern extending along the lower side panels. Some trams have advertisements on the sides instead of the average livery.

Maintenance
The Flexity 2 cars are maintained at a depot at Starr Gate which was purpose built by VolkerFitzpatrick, with input based on experience with tram depots elsewhere in Europe.

Fleet

See also
Blackpool Tramway
List of Blackpool Tramway tram stops

References

External links
 Blackpool version spec sheet
 Tram family brochure
 Tram family website

Bombardier Transportation tram vehicles
Train-related introductions in 2012
Tram vehicles of the United Kingdom
Transport in Blackpool
600 V DC multiple units
Bombardier Transportation multiple units